The year 1866 in architecture involved some significant events.

Buildings and structures

Buildings

 The seat of the Norwegian Parliament, Storting building, designed by Emil Victor Langlet, Inaugurated 5 March
 The building of Nationalgalerie starts in Berlin, designed by Friedrich August Stüler and Johann Heinrich Strack.
 The New Synagogue, Berlin, Germany is completed by Friedrich August Stüler to the design of Eduard Knoblauch.
 St. Mark's Church, Royal Tunbridge Wells, England, designed by Robert Lewis Roumieu, is consecrated.
 The Princess Theatre, Melbourne, Australia by architect William Pitt is completed.
 Basilique Notre-Dame de Marienthal is completed

Awards
 RIBA Royal Gold Medal – Matthew Digby Wyatt.
 Grand Prix de Rome, architecture: Jean-Louis Pascal.

Births
 February 15 – Banister Fletcher, English architect and architectural historian (died 1953)
 February 23 – Joseph Miller Huston, American architect working in Pennsylvania (died 1940)
 June 14 – Henry Sproatt, Canadian architect (died 1934)
 July 14 – Ragnar Östberg, Swedish architect (died 1945)
 July 29 – Jens Zetlitz Monrad Kielland, Norwegian architect (died 1926)
 August 1 – Claude Fayette Bragdon, American architect (died 1946)
 November 28 – Henry Bacon, American Beaux-Arts architect (died 1924)

Deaths
 March 23 – Ferdinand von Arnim, German architect and watercolor painter (born 1814)

References

Architecture
Years in architecture
19th-century architecture